Ch'alla Willk'i (Aymara ch'alla sand, willk'i gap, "sand gap", also spelled Challa Willkhi) is a  mountain in the Andes of Bolivia. It is located in the Oruro Department, San Pedro de Totora Province. The Luk'i Jawira (Lokhe Jahuira) originates north of Ch'alla Willk'i. It flows to the northwest.

References 

Mountains of Oruro Department